Jalan Sultan Azlan Shah is a major road in Kuala Lumpur, Malaysia. It was named after ninth Yang di-Pertuan Agong, Sultan Azlan Shah of Perak (1989 - 1994).

History
It was previously named Jalan Ipoh as it was part of the national highway 1 system where motorists could connect to Ipoh and so forth. 

In 2014 the Kuala Lumpur City Hall (DBKL) renamed the stretch from the Jalan Segambut junction to the Jalan Pahang junction of Jalan Ipoh to Jalan Sultan Azlan Shah.

Sultan Azlan Shah was the 34th Sultan of Perak, of which its former namesake Ipoh is the capital.

List of junctions

References

Roads in Kuala Lumpur